Kalevi Ilmari Kiviniemi (born 30 June 1958) is a Finnish concert organist. He has given over 2000 concerts, and his discography includes nearly 200 titles, many of them featuring significant and unique organs across the US, Japan, the Philippines, Australia, Italy, France, Switzerland and Germany. Kiviniemi is also considered to be a distinguished improviser, especially in the tradition of a French line that runs from Charles Tournemire through to Pierre Cochereau.

Career 
Born in Jalasjärvi, Kiviniemi studied at the Sibelius Academy, concert diploma in 1983 under Eero Väätäinen and Olli Linjama (improvisation). In the late 1980s and early 1990s he started an international career with recitals in Prague, Japan and London. He has toured e.g. in Europe, the US, Russia, Asia, Australia and the Philippines.

Kiviniemi has frequently performed at Notre Dame in Paris. His first performance there in 2000, together with Olivier Latry, titulaire des grands orgue of Notre-Dame, was televised. His first solo performance at Notre Dame was in 2002. In addition to solo recitals and chamber music recitals, he has appeared with major orchestras such as the Moscow Chamber Orchestra and the Moscow Symphony Orchestra. Kiviniemi has worked together with composer Aulis Sallinen and premiered his works in Finland, France and Great Britain.

Kiviniemi has played in some of the most celebrated venues in the world, such as Notre-Dame de Paris, Leipzig Gewandhaus, Tchaikovsky Hall in Moscow, the Great Hall of Moscow Conservatory, and the Sejong Art Center in Soul, Korea. He has given recitals at St. Sulpice and Basilique Sainte-Clotilde in Paris, Berlin Cathedral, Passau Cathedral, Merseburg Cathedral, Saint John the Divine in New York, Rockefeller Memorial Chapels in both Washington, D.C. and Chicago, Saint Patrick's Catholic Church in Washington, D.C., and Toronto Cathedral.

In Japan Kiviniemi has been invited to the Metropolitan Theatre, Osaka Concert Hall, Sapporo Kitara Concert Hall, Yokohama Minato Mirai Concert Hall and Tokyo Cathedral. He has served on the juries of international organ competitions (Nuremberg 1996, Capri 1998, Speyer 2001, Korschenbroich 2005, St. Albans 2013, Strasbourg 2016). Kiviniemi was the artistic director of the Lahti Organ Festival for eleven years, from 1991 to 2001. He worked as the artistic counsellor of the Lapua Organ Festival for eleven years.

In 2009 he played a concert of transcriptions at the Konzerthaus Dortmund. In 2010 he played a concert at the Spreckels Organ Pavilion in San Diego. In autumn 2010 he played concerts at the Laurenskerk in Rotterdam, at the Internationales Düsseldorfer Orgelfestival, at the Wuppertaler  Orgeltage and at St. Martin, Idstein.

Kiviniemi has been a jury member at international organ competitions, Nuremberg in 1996, Capri in 1998, Speyer in 2001, Korschenbroich in 2005, St. Albans International Organ Festival, U.K. in 2013, Strasbourg in 2016. He has given master classes and lectures, for instance at the Ruhr University Bochum, Germany, the University Appleton, Lawrence, USA, Gustavus Adolphus College, USA, the Gnesin Russian Academy of Music, Moscow, Russia, the University of Graz, Austria, the Museum of Science and Technology, Belgrad, Serbia, Sibelius Academy, Helsinki, Finland.

Selected recordings 
Kiviniemi's discography numbers more than 200 titles as of 2020, including recordings made on historic organs in the US, Japan, the Philippines, Australia, Italy, France, Switzerland and Germany, such as the Cavaillé-Coll organ of the Church of St. Ouen, Rouen and Orléans Cathedral. Kiviniemi was the first to record the complete organ works of Jean Sibelius, reviewed in 2010: 
'Judicious' is an apt description of Kiviniemi's playing style, as well as his choice of organ and repertoire. Whether it's the mighty Cavaillé-Coll of Saint-Ouen, the Grand Paschen organ of Pori’s Central Church or the noble Kangasala at Lakeuden Risti, one senses his choices are carefully made, the music matched to the instrument and its unique acoustic. This Sibelius recital is no exception, the late-19th-century Walcker – three manuals, with 16' and 32' pipes – seems ideally suited to the thrust and scale of the works at hand.

OrganEra recordings 
With the Finnish publisher Fuga he began in 2001 a series of recordings, OrganEra, planned to contain 20 volumes.
Vol. 1 Renaissance-Tänze, works by Francesco Bendusi, Antonio Valente, Tielman Susato, Adriano Banchieri, Hans Neusidler, and Claude Gervaise, among others, recorded on the Renaissance organ of the Schlosskirche in Schmalkalden, 2001 
Vol. 2 Bamboo Organ, works by Michel Corrette, Jean-Baptiste Lully, Jean-Philippe Rameau, Antonio de Cabezón, Juan Bautista José Cabanilles, Luis de Milán, Luys de Narváez, Fortunato Chelleri, Johann Caspar Kerll, Gaetano Piazza, Gioachino Rossini, John Blow, and John Stanley, among others, recorded on the bamboo organ of Las Piñas in Manila, 2003 
Vol. 3 Heroic Song, recorded on the organ of Lapua Cathedral, 2003 
Vol. 4 Angel Dream, transcriptions for organ, recorded on the organ of Lapua Cathedral, 2003 
Vol. 5 Waltzing Matilda, recorded on the Grand Concert Organ of the Melbourne Town Hall, 
Vol. 6 Serassi, Italian organ music, works by Niccolo Moretti, Antonio Diana, Baldassare Galuppi, Vincenzo Palafuti, Michelangelo Rossi, Domenico Zipoli and Padre Davide da Bergamo, among others, recorded on the Serassi Organ of San Biagio in Caprino Bergamasco, 2004 
Vol. 7 Sibelius, Jean Sibelius Complete Organ Works, recorded on the Walcker of the Stadtkirche in Winterthur, 2004 
Vol. 8 Canonnade, recorded on the Holzhey Organ of the abbey church in Neresheim, 2004 
Vol. 9 Bombarde, recorded on the organ of the Matthäuskirche in Stuttgart, 2004 
Vol. 10 Liszt, The historic Organ at St. Mary's Basilica, Kevelaer, Germany. 2006.
Vol. 11 Wurlitzer, the biggest in the world. The Wurlitzer theatre pipe organ at the Sanfilippo Victorian Palace, Farrington Hills, Illinois, USA. 2006.
Vol. 12 Jehan Alain, works by Jehan Alain, recorded on the organ of the Church of the Cross in Lahti, 2006 
Vol. 13 Franck, organ works by César Franck, recorded at the Central Pori Church, 2009 
Vol. 14 Cavaillé-Coll, works by Marcel Dupré, Henri Nibelle, César Franck, Alexandre Guilmant, Charles-Marie Widor, and improvisation of Kiviniemi, recorded in church of St. Ouen, Rouen, 2008 and 2009
Vol. 15 Rédemption. The historic Stahlhuth-Jann Organ of St. Martin's Church, Dudelange, Luxembourg. 2011. 
Vol. 16 The Cliburn Organ, the biggest French style organ in the world. The Rildia Bee O’Bryan Cliburn Organ. Casavant Frères limitée. Broadway Baptist Church, Fort Worth, Texas, USA. 2015. 
Vol. 17 Finlandia, Historic Kangasala Organ in Tampere Cathedral, Finland. 2015. 
Vol. 18 Antico. The oldest playable organ in the world, Basilique Notre Dame de Valère in Sion, Switzerland. 2020. 
Vol. 19 Stockwerk. The Harder-Völkmann Organ in Stockwerk, Gröbenzell, Germany. 2016. 
Vol. 20 Organ Gravitation. 2018.

Other recordings 
Chicago Concert, works by Gabriel Pierné, Joseph Bonnet, Marcel Dupré, Charles-Marie Widor,  Camille Saint-Saëns, Aulis Sallinen, Joonas Kokkonen, Aimo Känkänen, Jean Sibelius and improvisation of Kiviniemi, 2000 details
Lakeuden Ristin urut (Organ of the Lakeuden Risti church), works by Franz Liszt (arr. Kiviniemi), César Franck, Alexandre Guilmant, Marcel Dupré, Pierre Cochereau, his own, Oskar Merikanto, recorded in Seinäjoki in Lakeuden Risti (designed by Alvar Aalto), on an instrument built by the Kangasala organ factory, 2009

Awards for recordings 
Many of his recordings have won awards, Improvisation was named Star Recording by the magazine The Organ in 1999, and Visions, containing Finnish organ music, received the Janne Prize for the best Finnish solo disc. In 2009 his CD Lakeuden Ristin Urut was chosen as the organ album of the year in the US.

Compositions 
Kiviniemi has improvised and composed.
Sarja uruille (1977)
Suite francaise (1991)
Caprice héroique, hommage à Aristide Cavaillé-Coll
Souvenir, hommage à Madame Dupré
Carillon, hommage à Marcel Dupré
Visions for dancers and organ (1998)
Poème (1999)
Mosaique (2002)
Introduction et Gigue hommage à Pierre Cochereau (2002)
Intermezzo (2005)
Revontulet (2005)
Fantasia Suomalainen rukous (2008)
Étude pour les Pédales ”Noë” (2009)
De Profundis Fukushiman uhrien muistolle (2011)
Suite (Le Feu, Le Ciel, La Mosaique brisée) (2011)
Fantasia '"Lohikäärmeen tuli" for harp and organ (2012)
Poem "Broken Soul" (Introduction, Consolation, Broken Soul) (2015)

Awards 
Kiviniemi received the Luonnotar Prize at the Sibelius Festival in Lahti in 2003 and the trophy of the Organum Society in 2004 for services to Finnish organ music. In 2009 he was awarded the State Prize for Music in Finland for lifelong achievements in music.

References

External links 
 Kalevi Kiviniemi website

1958 births
Living people
People from Jalasjärvi
Finnish organists
Male classical organists
Classical organists
Organ improvisers
21st-century organists
21st-century male musicians